Rene Ronald Chapdelaine (born September 27, 1966) is a Canadian former professional ice hockey defenceman. He was drafted by the Los Angeles Kings in the eighth round, 149th overall, in the 1986 NHL Entry Draft. He played 32 National Hockey League games with the Kings over three seasons between 1990 and 1993

He was a member of the Lake Superior State Lakers 1988 NCAA Championship men's ice hockey team.

Career statistics

Regular season and playoffs

External links
 

1966 births
Living people
Canadian expatriate ice hockey players in the United States
Canadian ice hockey defencemen
Ice hockey people from Saskatchewan
Lake Superior State Lakers men's ice hockey players
Long Beach Ice Dogs (IHL) players
Long Beach Ice Dogs (WCHL) players
Los Angeles Kings draft picks
Los Angeles Kings players
NCAA men's ice hockey national champions
New Haven Nighthawks players
Sportspeople from Weyburn
Peoria Rivermen (IHL) players
Phoenix Roadrunners (IHL) players
St. John's Maple Leafs players
San Antonio Dragons players
San Diego Gulls (IHL) players
Utah Grizzlies (IHL) players
Weyburn Red Wings players